Melvin Glover (born May 15, 1961 in The Bronx), better known by his stage name Grandmaster Melle Mel (or simply Melle Mel), is an American rapper who was the lead vocalist and songwriter of Grandmaster Flash and the Furious Five.

Career
Glover began performing in the late 1970s. He may have been the first rapper to call himself MC (master of ceremonies). Other Furious Five members included his brother The Kidd Creole (Nathaniel Glover), Scorpio (Eddie Morris), Rahiem (Guy Todd Williams) and Cowboy (Keith Wiggins). While a member of the group, Cowboy created the term hip-hop while teasing a friend who had just joined the US Army, by scat singing the words "hip/hop/hip/hop" in a way that mimicked the rhythmic cadence of marching soldiers.

Grandmaster Flash & The Furious Five began recording for Enjoy Records and released "Superrappin'" in 1979. They later moved on to Sugar Hill Records and were popular on the R&B charts with party songs like "Freedom" and "The Birthday Party". They released numerous singles, gaining a gold disc for "Freedom", and touring. In 1982 Melle Mel began to turn to more socially-aware subject matter, in particular the Reagan administration's economic (Reaganomics) and drug policies, and their effect on the black community.

A song "The Message" became an instant classic and one of the first examples of conscious hip-hop by exploring personal and social themes. Mel recorded a rap over session musician Duke Bootee's instrumental track "The Jungle". Some of Mel's lyrics on "The Message" were taken directly from "Superrappin'". Other than Melle Mel, no members of Grandmaster Flash & The Furious Five actually appear on the record. Bootee also contributed vocals (Rahiem was to later lip sync Bootee's parts in the music video).

"The Message" would later be the first hip-hop record ever to be added to the United States National Archive of Historic Recordings and the first hip hop record inducted into the Grammy Hall of Fame. Mel would also go on to write songs about struggling life in New York City ("New York, New York"), and making it through life in general ("Survival (The Message 2)"). Grandmaster Flash split from the group after contract disputes between Melle Mel and their promoter Sylvia Robinson in regard to royalties for "The Message". When Flash filed a lawsuit against Sugar Hill Records, the factions of The Furious Five parted.

Mel became known as Grandmaster Melle Mel and the leader of the Furious Five. The group went on to produce the anti-drug song "White Lines (Don't Don't Do It)". An unofficial music video starred up-and-coming actor Laurence Fishburne and was directed by then-unknown film student Spike Lee. The record was falsely credited to "Grandmaster + Melle Mel" by Sugar Hill Records, in order to fool the public into thinking Grandmaster Flash had participated on the record.

Mel gained greater fame and success after appearing in the movie Beat Street, with a song based on the movie's title. He performed a memorable rap on Chaka Khan's smash hit song "I Feel for You", which introduced hip hop to a wider and more mainstream R&B audience. Grandmaster Melle Mel & The Furious Five had further hits with "Step Off", "Pump Me Up", "King of the Streets", "Jesse", and "Vice", the latter being released on the soundtrack to the TV show Miami Vice. "Jesse" was a highly political song which urged people to vote for then presidential candidate Jesse Jackson.

In 1988, after an almost four-year layoff, Mel and Flash reunited and released the album On The Strength, but with up-and-coming new school artists such as Eric B. & Rakim, DJ Jazzy Jeff & The Fresh Prince, Public Enemy, Boogie Down Productions, and Big Daddy Kane dominating the hip-hop market, the album failed miserably. Mel performed with The King Dream Chorus and Holiday Crew on "King Holiday" aimed at having Dr. Martin Luther King Jr.'s birthday declared a national holiday. Mel also performed with Artists United Against Apartheid on the anti-apartheid song "Sun City" which was aimed at discouraging other artists from performing in South Africa until its government ended its policy of apartheid. Mel ended the decade by winning two Grammy Awards for his work on Quincy Jones' Back On The Block and Q – The Autobiography of Quincy Jones albums.

In 1995, Duran Duran did a cover version of "White Lines" featuring performances from Grandmaster Flash and Melle Mel and released it as the second single from the Duran Duran covers album Thank You':.

In 1996, Mel contributed vocals to the US edition of Cher's hit "One By One". Their version is only available on the maxi CD format.

In 1997, Melle Mel signed to Straight Game Records and released Right Now, an album which features Scorpio (from the Furious Five) and Rondo. This album took more of a harder rap style. It barely sold at all in the US and the UK.

In 2001, under the name Die Hard, he released the song "On Lock" with Rondo on the soundtrack of the movie Blazin. Die Hard released an album of the same name in 2002 on 7PRecords.

On November 14, 2006, Mel collaborated with author Cricket Casey and released the children's book The Portal In The Park, which comes with a bonus CD of his rapped narration. It also features two songs, "World Family Tree" and "The Fountain of Truth", by a then unknown Lady Gaga performing with Mel. The book was re-released in 2010. Also in 2006, Melle Mel attended professional wrestling school. In 2007 (at age 45), he stated in an interview with allhiphop.com that "I'm going to try to take some of John Cena's money and get with WWE and do my thing".

On January 30, 2007, Mel released his first ever solo album, Muscles. The first single and music video was "M3 – The New Message". On March 12, 2007, Melle Mel and The Furious Five (joined by DJ Grandmaster Flash) became the first rap group ever inducted into the Rock and Roll Hall of Fame. In his acceptance speech, Mel implored the recording industry members in attendance to do more to restore hip hop to the culture of music and art that it once was, rather than the culture of violence that it has become. He added, "I've never been shot, I've never been arrested, and I've been doing hip hop all my life. I can't change things all by myself. We need everybody's help, so let's do it and get this thing done."

On October 10, 2008, Mel appeared on Bronx-based culinary adventure show Bronx Flavor alongside host Baron Ambrosia. In the episode "Night at the Bodega", he appears as a spiritual mentor to sway the Baron from his over-indulgent ways and get him on the right path to success.

In April 2011, it was revealed that he would take part in a new hip hop/pro wrestling collaboration, the Urban Wrestling Federation. Its first bout "First Blood" was recorded in June 2011.

Mel also appeared in Ice-T's 2012 hip hop documentary Something from Nothing: The Art of Rap.

In August 2015, Mel appeared with Kool Moe Dee and Grandmaster Caz in Macklemore and Ryan Lewis's song and music video "Downtown".

In May 2016, Mel and Scorpio, performing as Grandmaster's Furious Five ft. Melle Mel & Scorpio, released their single "Some Kind of Sorry".

 Discography 

 Albums 
 1984 Grandmaster Melle Mel and the Furious Five (a.k.a. Work Party)
 1985 Stepping Off (as Grandmaster Melle Mel and the Furious Five)
 1989 Piano (as Grandmaster Melle Mel and the Furious Five)
 1997 Right Now (as Grandmaster Mele-Mel & Scorpio)
 2001 On Lock (Grandmaster Melle Mel & Rondo as Die Hard)
 2006 The Portal In The Park (as Grandmaster Mele Mel with appearances by Lady Gaga)
 2007 Muscles'' (as Grandmaster Mele Mel)

Singles 
 1979 "We Rap More Mellow" (as The Younger Generation)
 1979 "Flash to the Beat" (as Flash and the Furious 5)
 1979 "Superrappin'" (as Grandmaster Flash and the Furious Five)
 1980 "Freedom" (as Grandmaster Flash and the Furious Five)
 1980 "The Birthday Party" (as Grandmaster Flash and the Furious Five)
 1981 "Showdown" (as The Furious Five Meets The Sugarhill Gang)
 1981 "It's Nasty (Genius of Love)" (as Grandmaster Flash and the Furious Five)
 1981 "Scorpio" (as Grandmaster Flash and the Furious Five)
 1981 "The Adventures of Grandmaster Flash on the Wheels of Steel" (as Grandmaster Flash and the Furious Five)
 1982 "The Message" (as Grandmaster Flash and the Furious Five)
 1982 "Message II (Survival)" (as Melle Mel & Duke Bootee)
 1983 "New York New York" (as Grandmaster Flash and the Furious Five)
 1983 "White Lines (Don't Don't Do It)" (as Grandmaster & Melle Mel / Grandmaster Flash and the Furious Five / Grandmaster Flash and Melle Mel)
 1984 "Continuous White Lines" (Remix – as Grandmaster Melle Mel and the Furious Five)
 1984 "Jesse" (as Grandmaster Melle Mel)
 1984 "Beat Street Breakdown" a.k.a. "Beat Street" (as Grandmaster Melle Mel and the Furious Five)
 1984 "Step Off" (as Grandmaster Melle Mel and the Furious Five)
 1984 "We Don't Work for Free" (as Grandmaster Melle Mel and the Furious Five)
 1984 "World War III" (as Grandmaster Melle Mel and the Furious Five / Grandmaster Melle Mel)
 1985 "King Of the Streets" (as Grandmaster Melle Mel)
 1985 "Pump Me Up" (as Grandmaster Melle Mel and the Furious Five)
 1985 "Vice" (as Grandmaster Melle Mel)
 1985 "The Mega-Melle Mix" (as Melle Mel)
 1988 "Gold" (as Grandmaster Flash and the Furious Five)
 1988 "Magic Carpet Ride" (as Grandmaster Flash and the Furious Five)
 1994 "Sun Don't Shine in the Hood" (Split 12" single with "Da Original" as The Furious Five)
 1995 "The Message 95" (Remix – as Grandmaster Flash and the Furious Five
 1997 "The Message" (Remix – as Grandmaster Flash and the Furious Five)
 1997 "Mama" (as Grandmaster Mele-Mel & Scorpio)
 1997 "Mr. Big Stuff" (as Grandmaster Mele-Mel & Scorpio)
 2003 "Where Ya At?" (as Melle Mel)
 2007 "M-3" (as Grandmaster Mele Mel)
 2011 "Markus Schulz Presents Dakota feat. Grandmaster Mele Mel & Scorpio" – Sleepwalkers
 2014 "Don't Shoot" (as Grandmaster Melle Mel)
 2016 "Some Kind of Sorry" (as Grandmaster's Furious Five Ft. Mele Mel & Scorpio)

Collaborations 
 1984 "I Feel for You" by Chaka Khan
 1986 "MC Story" by MC Chill and Emanon (The Baby Beatbox)
 1986 "Susie" by Emanon
 1986/87 "Who Do You Think You're Funkin' With" — collaborating with Afrika Bambaataa 
 1989 "What's the Matter with Your World?" (with Van Silk)
1995 "White Lines (Don't Don't Do It)" by Duran Duran
 1996 "What Order" (with Keith LeBlanc)
 2005 "RSVP" (with Nikkole)
 2008 "Hip Hop Fantasy" by Chutzpah - for the track Bizness.
 2009 "Electro Soul Satisfaction" — collaborating with Mic Murphy of The System

Awards and nominations 

!
|-
|align=center|1990
|"Back on the Block"
| Grammy Award for Best Rap Performance by a Duo or Group
|
|rowspan="2"| 
|-
|align=center|1996
|"Stomp"
| Grammy Award for Best R&B Performance by a Duo or Group with Vocals
|
|-

References

External links
 Biography at hiphop.sh
 
 

1961 births
African-American male rappers
East Coast hip hop musicians
Grammy Award winners for rap music
Grandmaster Flash and the Furious Five members
Living people
Rappers from the Bronx
21st-century American rappers
21st-century American male musicians
21st-century African-American musicians
20th-century African-American people
Sugar Hill Records (hip hop label) artists